Bournemouth Corporation Tramways served the town of Bournemouth in Dorset (although at the time it was in Hampshire) from 23 July 1902 until 8 April 1936.

History

In June 1905 the company took a lease on the Poole and District Electric Tramways and a connection was made to this system for through running.

On 1 May 1908, a tram derailed in Bournemouth Town Centre, killing 7 and injuring 26.

Until May 1911, part of the system was equipped with conduit current collection to avoid unsightly overhead wiring on the central section of the tramway. From May 1911, overhead wiring was introduced.

Infrastructure

The system extended to the suburb of Winton to the north and to the adjacent towns of Poole to the west and Christchurch to the east.

The major lines were:

There were four depots:

Tramcars
The fleet, in a livery of maroon and yellow, consisted of:
 151 double deck tramcars.
 1 single deck tramcar.

Closure
The tramway system began its closure in 1929 when motorbuses of Hants and Dorset Motor Services were introduced as a tram replacement on the Lower Parkstone route. In 1933 Bournemouth Corporation began to open trolleybus routes, and in 1936 the remaining tram routes were converted to operation by the trolleybuses of Bournemouth Corporation.

Preserved tramcars

Bournemouth tram number 85 is now preserved and on static display at the  Crich National tramway museum, before its transfer it was displayed at the Museum of Electricity in Christchurch.

The body of car 106 was discovered on a Dorset farm, and eventually presented to Seaton Tramway in 1974. It was launched into service in 1992, bearing the fleet number 16 and a livery closely resembling that of the Bournemouth system.

See also
List of town tramway systems in the United Kingdom

References

External links
 Bournemouth Corporation Tramways at the British Tramway Company Badges and Buttons website.
 Bournemouth Corporation Tramcar 85 on Vintage Carriage Trust website

Tram transport in England
Transport in Bournemouth
Rail transport in Dorset
Tram transport in Hampshire
3 ft 6 in gauge railways in England